The Young, the Evil and the Savage is a 1968 Italian giallo film directed by Antonio Margheriti.

Plot 
A woman is drowned in a bathtub and then placed in a trunk that lands in a pickup truck going to St. Hilda College. Among the teachers is a newcomer, Mrs. Clay, a science teacher. In addition, there is a young teacher, Richard Barrett, a diving instructor, and the college gardener La Foret. There are only seven girls at the institute, as the others are on vacation. Arrived at the destination, the trunk is brought to the basement.

Soon one of the girls, Betty Ann, who had gone to the basement, is strangled and taken away. The search for the missing girl begins. Jill claims she died and was killed by the gardener. All girls are told not to leave the rooms, but one, Lucille, has an appointment with her teacher Richard, with whom she has an affair. Nevertheless, Lucille decides to go out and goes to a small house on a hill, where she discovers Betty Ann's body and runs away. She meets Richard and tells him everything. When they return, Betty Ann's body is gone. Lucille is desperate to leave school, so Richard advises her to pack three in the pool and wait for him.

Lucille returns to boarding school, and while she takes a shower, the gardener spies on her from a tree. She notices strange movements on the plant and returns to the room frightened. Another girl, Cynthia, takes a shower and is killed in front of the gardener. But this time, Jill finds the body, and the police are called. Shortly after the agents arrive, the gardener is killed. Lucille wants to escape because she believes Cynthia was accidentally killed in her place. Meanwhile, he entrusts himself to his girlfriend Denise and tells her about the date with Richard at the pool. As she has to be questioned by the police, she asks her friend to go to her place. Denise accepts and is attacked by the killer, but Jill, who has followed her, manages to let him run away. The police dogs finally find the body of Betty Ann.

In the end, the girl finds him, but when he wants to go up, the man is pushed down the stairs. The killer reveals himself: it's Pierre, Lucille's cousin, who disguised himself as Mrs. Clay to capture the legacy and blame it on the real Mrs. Clay hiding in the trunk, and then stage her suicide.

Pierre wounds Richard, but Inspector Durand kills him. So tranquility returns to college, and Lucille and Richard end up together.

Cast

Production
The Young, the Evil and the Savage was originally developed as a project for Mario Bava. Bava was contacted by producer Lawrence Woolner of the Woolner Brothers, who had distributed his films Hercules in the Haunted World and Blood and Black Lace in the United States. Woolner had relocated to Rome to set up a new independent production company with Giuseppe De Blasio. Woolner approached Bava with a story idea about a killer stalking a school for young debutantes. Bava accepted the offer to direct the film, which at the time had the title Cry Nightmare. In either late May or early June, he began working with the English writing team of Brian Degas and Tudor Gates. The film's screenplay was completed in July. According to Mario Bava's son, Lamberto Bava, "Just a short time before the filming was to begin, [Mario] had an argument with the producers and he abandoned the film."

The film's director, Antonio Margheriti, stated that he initially became involved with the Woolner Brothers as they had distributed his film Castle of Blood. Margheriti stated he did not recall why Bava did not complete the film, stating that "I think Mario was busy at that time, working on Diabolik or something", and then they gave the production to him and his production company. According to Bava's biographer Tim Lucas, Margheriti took over production shortly after Bava left, as locations had already been scouted for and secured, cast and crew had been hired, and a theme song had been written and recorded.

The film was shot on location in Rome and on the French Riviera under a new title, Sette vergini per il diavolo.

Release
The Young, the Evil and the Savage was submitted to the Italian censors on December 22, 1967, but the film was not released for another two months until it premiered under the title Nude...si muore on February 20, 1968. Bava, Gates and Degas received no screenwriting credit for their work on the film; the film instead credits Margheriti and Franco Bottari for writing the screenplay from a story credited to Giovanni Simonelli. Lucas stated that the film follows Bava, Gates and Degas' script "almost 100% faithfully."

The film was released in the United States by American International Pictures as The Young, the Evil and the Savage, where it opened in New York as on August 14, 1968 on a double bill with Witchfinder General.

Margheriti retrospectively described the film as a "nice little giallo", noting that it was ahead of its time, as the giallo did not gain high popularity in Italy until the release of Dario Argento's The Bird with the Crystal Plumage.

Reception
In a contemporary review, David McGillivray found the film to be a "succession of tame and predictable murders [...] investigated with understandable indifference by Michael Rennie" and concluded that the film "will come as a grave disappointment to those who recall "Anthony Dawson's" flair for atmospherics in his earlier horror films."

References

Sources

External links

The Young, the Evil and the Savage at Variety Distribution

1968 films
Giallo films
1960s Italian-language films
English-language Italian films
1960s English-language films
Films directed by Antonio Margheriti
Films scored by Carlo Savina
1960s multilingual films
Italian multilingual films
1960s Italian films